The Columbus Transfer Company Warehouse, also known as the Carr Building, is a historic building in Downtown Columbus, Ohio. It was built in two phases, in 1882 and 1900, and was listed on the National Register of Historic Places in 1983.

The building was rehabilitated from 1982 to 1983.

See also
 National Register of Historic Places listings in Columbus, Ohio

References

Buildings in downtown Columbus, Ohio
Commercial buildings completed in 1882
Commercial buildings on the National Register of Historic Places in Ohio
National Register of Historic Places in Columbus, Ohio